Baron Charles Paul de Cumont (31 May 1902 – 9 June 1990) was a Belgian general, and served as chairman of the Belgian joint chiefs of staff between 1959 and 1963, and chairman of the NATO Military Committee from 1962 to 1963 and again in 1964 to 1968.

Awards
Awards de Cumont has received during his life.

References

External links 
 http://www.ars-moriendi.be/DE_CUMONT.HTM

NATO military personnel
Belgian Army personnel
1902 births
1990 deaths
Knights Commander of the Order of Merit of the Federal Republic of Germany